Axelle Étienne (born 26 March 1998 in Bondy) is a French cyclist who competes in the BMX.

Axelle was born in Bondy and grew up in Vaujours, in the department of Seine-Saint-Denis. Her parents are from the island of Guadeloupe. Her brother Patrick also competes in BMX racing with both showing promise at a young age. She won French junior titles in 2013 and 2014. Etienne then won the women’s
junior race and the women’s junior time trial at the 2015 UCI BMX World Championships.

In 2017 Étienne won the French national title aged 19. Etienne won the bronze medal at the 2019 UCI BMX World Championships.

In June 2021, she was named among the French representatives for the delayed 2020 Summer Games in Tokyo to compete in the BMX racing, and placed 7th in the Women’s BMX racing final.

References

External links
 
 
 
 

1998 births
Living people
BMX riders
French female cyclists
Olympic cyclists of France
Cyclists at the 2020 Summer Olympics
French people of Guadeloupean descent
People from Bondy
Sportspeople from Seine-Saint-Denis
Cyclists from Île-de-France
21st-century French women